The Oskil Reservoir (sometimes translated as Oskol, Oskilske -) was an artificial lake on the Oskil River in Kharkiv Oblast, Ukraine. It was formerly known as the Chervony-Oskil Reservoir. 

The reservoir was opened in 1958. Before it was drained, the reservoir's area was 130 km², with a maximal length of 125 km, a maximal width of 4 km, an average depth of 4 m and a volume of approximately 474 hm³. The purpose of the reservoir was to regulate water levels, to serve as a source for electricity, and to help the fishing industry.

Destruction 
During the 2022 Russian invasion of Ukraine, the reservoir was noted for its strategic importance, as causing downstream flooding would be one way to slow Russian advances in the Donbas. 

In July 2022, Russian shelling destroyed the reservoir's dam, draining its level to one-sixth that of its pre-war size. The loss of water from the reservoir caused significant environmental damage, including the deaths of millions of fish and other endangered species.

References

Reservoirs in Ukraine
Geography of Kharkiv Oblast